Centennial Hall may refer to:

in Canada
 Centennial Hall (London, Ontario), London, Ontario, Canada
 Centennial Concert Hall, Winnipeg, Manitoba, Canada
 Saskatoon Centennial Auditorium, former name of TCU Place

in Germany
 , 1902
 Jahrhunderthalle, Frankfurt, 1963

in Poland
 Centennial Hall (Wrocław) (Hala Stulecia / Jahrhunderthalle Breslau) (1913), built in the German Empire, since 1945 Wrocław (Poland), since 2006 UNESCO World Heritage Site
 Hala Stulecia Sopotu, the Centennial Hall of Sopot, Poland

in the United States

 Centennial Hall (Tucson, Arizona), a concert venue
 Centennial Hall Convention Center, built in 1976, in Hayward, California
 Centennial Hall (Denver, Colorado), a Denver Landmark
 Centennial Hall-Edward Waters College, Jacksonville, Florida, listed on the National Register of Historic Places (NRHP)
 Centennial Hall (Valentine, Nebraska), NRHP-listed
 Centennial Hall (North Hampton, New Hampshire), community hall and historic schoolhouse, NRHP-listed
 Savage Arena, Toledo, Ohio, 1976, formerly known as "Centennial Hall"
 Lehi Ward Tithing Barn-Centennial Hall, Lehi, Utah, NRHP-listed

Architectural disambiguation pages